Christopher Grossman (born 6 March 1987) is a retired Australian football (soccer) player who is currently Head Coach of the Brisbane Roar FC Youth.

Club career
He was signed from the Queensland Academy of Sport. The Roar allowed him to play for then current Brisbane Premier League champions, Rochedale Rovers Football Club, prior to the commencement of the A-League's third season to maintain match sharpness.

On 24 December 2008, Grossman announced that he had signed with A-League expansion team North Queensland Fury for the 2009–10 season.
During the season, he has found himself the unfamiliar role of right back, to which he has excelled in and revelled at the chance of first team starting football. Coach Ian Ferguson elected to play him there largely due to the extensive injury list at North Queensland Fury.

On 21 November 2012 Grossman joined the Newcastle Jets as a short-term injury replacement for Ben Kantarovski.

Grossman signed with Port Melbourne SC ahead of the 2013 season and spent the next 3 seasons at the club, serving as captain and vice-captain during this period. He left the club following the 2015 season.

A-League statistics

1- includes A-League final series statistics
2- includes FIFA Club World Cup statistics; AFC Champions League statistics are included in season commencing after group stages (i.e. ACL in A-League seasons etc.)

References

External links
North Queensland Fury profile
Newcastle Jets profile

1987 births
Living people
Soccer players from Brisbane
Australia youth international soccer players
Australia under-20 international soccer players
A-League Men players
Brisbane Roar FC players
Northern Fury FC players
Newcastle Jets FC players
Australian Institute of Sport soccer players
National Premier Leagues players
Port Melbourne SC players
Association football midfielders
Association football central defenders
Australian soccer players